Waldo Mountain is a summit in Lane County, Oregon, in the United States. with an elevation of . It is in the Waldo Lake Wilderness and the Willamette National Forest.

The mountain and nearby Waldo Lake were named for John B. Waldo, an Oregon jurist. The Waldo Mountain Fire Lookout stands at the summit.

References

External links
 

Mountains of Lane County, Oregon
Mountains of Oregon